Christos Voutsas (born 31 July 2001) is a Greek professional footballer who plays as a defensive midfielder for Super League 2 club Panathinaikos B, on loan from Levadiakos.

References

2001 births
Living people
Greek footballers
Greece youth international footballers
Super League Greece 2 players
Super League Greece players
Ergotelis F.C. players
Association football midfielders
Footballers from Thessaloniki
Greek expatriate sportspeople in the Netherlands
Greek expatriate footballers
Expatriate footballers in the Netherlands
Levadiakos F.C. players
PAOK FC players
Panathinaikos F.C. players
Panathinaikos F.C. B players
Willem II (football club) players